The Place de l'Obélisque (Obelisk Square) is a central plaza in Dakar, Senegal.  It is an important site for protests, demonstrations, parades, and other events.  The plaza's obelisk, which is adorned with the Roman numerals MCMLX, commemorates Senegal's 1960 independence from France.

References

Dakar
Obelisks
Squares in Senegal